Oru Paathiraa Swapnam Pole is a 2021 Malayalam language short film Written and Directed by Sharan Venugopal. The film stars Nadiya Moidu and Garggi Ananthan in lead roles and is produced by Satyajit Ray Film and Television Institute. The film was premiered at the 51st International Film Festival of India under the Indian Panorama section. The film won the best film on Family values at the 67th National Film Awards.

Plot 
Sudha, an entrepreneur and a mother of a college girl, finds her world upside down when a doctor suspects that she has cancer. Her worries deepens even further when one day she goes through her daughter's laptop and chances upon a video that can change their dynamic forever.

Cast 
Nadiya Moidu as Sudha 
Garggi Ananthan as Theertha 
Devaki Bhaagi as Dr. Rekha 
Sudhi Panoor as Wahab
Saheer Muhammed as Mathew

Production 

The screenplay was written in 2018 by Sharan Venugopal based on a short story titled 'Vaibhavam' written by Susmesh Chandroth. The film was shot in January 2019 in and around Fort Kochi. The post production of the film was completed in Kolkata and Mumbai by July 2019.

References

External links 
 

Indian short films
Best Film on Family Welfare National Film Award winners